Listed below are the private residences of the various presidents of the United States. For a list of official residences, see President of the United States § Residence.

Private homes of the presidents

This is a list of homes where presidents resided with their families before or after their term of office.

Presidential vacation homes

During their term of office, many presidents have owned or leased vacation homes in various parts of the country, which are often called by journalists the "Western White House", "Summer White House", or "Winter White House", depending on location or season.

Summer White House

The "Summer White House" is typically the name given to the summer vacation residence of the sitting president of the United States aside from Camp David, the mountain-based military camp in Frederick County, Maryland, used as a country retreat and for high-alert protection of presidents and their guests.

Winter White House
A "Winter White House" is typically the name given to the winter vacation residence of the standing president of the United States aside from Camp David, the mountain-based military camp in Frederick County, Maryland, used as a country retreat and for high-alert protection of the president and his guests.

Although Harry Truman and John F. Kennedy had spent significant time in Florida (Harry Truman having spent time there in the summer), Richard Nixon's Florida White House was the first that reporters called the "Winter White House".

Western/Southern White House 

The Western White House and Southern White House are terms sometimes applied to additional residences of the president, especially when those residences are very distant from the District of Columbia. Famous examples include Donald Trump's Mar-a-Lago resort in Palm Beach, Florida, as well as George W. Bush's Prairie Chapel Ranch in Crawford, Texas; Lyndon B. Johnson, Richard M. Nixon and Ronald Reagan have also used the term for their private residences (Nixon and Reagan in California, Johnson in Texas).

Other secondary "White Houses"
The first governmental spending on property improvements of private presidential residences was at Dwight Eisenhower's Gettysburg farm, where the Secret Service added three guard posts to a fence. Federal law now allows the president to designate a residence outside of the White House as his temporary offices, so that federal money can be used to provide required facilities.

Other official residences occupied by presidents

Official residences occupied while in other offices
This is a list of official residences occupied by presidents with their families (before or after their term of office) while they served in the office related to the residence.

Official residences occupied by presidents while another member of their family served in other offices
This is a list of official residences occupied by presidents with their families (before or after their term of office) while another member of their family served in the office related to the residence.

Notes

See also
 Presidential memorials in the United States

References

External links
PresidentialMuseums.com – Presidential museums, libraries, birthplaces, centers, and other notable places of historic importance.
Discover Our Shared Heritage Travel Itinerary: American Presidents: List of Sites – National Park Service

 Residences
 

White House